Arumugam Canagaratnam (1873–1929) was a Ceylon Tamil lawyer and member of the Legislative Council of Ceylon.

Early life and family
Canagaratnam was born in 1873. He was the son of Visuvanathan Arumugam. Canagaratnam was educated at Jaffna Central College and Wesley College, Colombo. He had his higher education in Calcutta.

Canagaratnam's nephew C. Sittampalam was a government minister.

Career
Canagaratnam joined the legal profession after finishing his education.

Canagaratnam became chairman of the Rural Education Development Board in the 1920s. He was also chairman of the Jaffna Local Board and Jaffna Urban Council. He was elected to the Legislative Council of Ceylon as the member for the Northern Province South at the 1924 election.

Canagaratnam campaigned for the establishment of the University of Ceylon and edited a nationalist journal called The Ceylon Patriot. He built Stanley College, which was later renamed Canagaratnam Maha Vidyalayam, using his own funds. Canagaratnam Road is also named after him.

References

1873 births
1929 deaths
Alumni of Jaffna Central College
Alumni of Wesley College, Colombo
Local authority councillors of Sri Lanka
Members of the Legislative Council of Ceylon
People from Northern Province, Sri Lanka
People from British Ceylon
Sri Lankan Tamil journalists
Sri Lankan Tamil lawyers
Sri Lankan Tamil politicians